Bare på jobb is a 2003 Norwegian comedy film directed by Kjell Hammerø, starring Geir Amundsen.

Robert Reiakvam (Amundsen) is an unsuccessful documentary film maker, who manages to get government support for his latest project: a documentary about debt collectors. He finds out that illegal debt collectors receive no government benefits, and changes the focus of the film to one about social injustice. When the government withdraws support, the debt collectors, who have grown enthusiastic about the project, offer to finance it. Reiakvam accepts the money, believing it is a gift, and unwittingly becomes a character in his own movie.

References

External links
 
 Bare på jobb at Filmweb.no (Norwegian)
 Bare på jobb at the Norwegian Film Institute

2003 films
2003 comedy films
Norwegian comedy films
2000s Norwegian-language films